Dendrolimus arizanus is a moth of the  family Lasiocampidae. It is found in Taiwan.

The wingspan is 45–57 mm. Adults are on wing in September.

References

Moths described in 1910
Lasiocampidae
Moths of Asia